POA may refer to:

Organisations 
 Pakistan Olympic Association
 POA (trade union), for UK prison officers
 Prison Officers' Association (Ireland)
 Russian Liberation Army

Science and technology 
 Poa, a genus in Poaceae (the grass family)
 Place of articulation, a linguistic term
 Pony of the Americas, a horse breed
 Portable Object Adapter, in the CORBA specification
 Preoptic area, a brain region
 Price of anarchy, a concept in game theory
 Program of Activities, for UNFCCC Clean Development Mechanism
 Proof-of-authority, a blockchain algorithm

Law 
 Power of attorney
 Public Order Act
 Property owner association or homeowner association

Music 
 Paris Opera Awards
 POA (album), 1973, by Blocco Mentale
 "POA", a song from Future (Future album)

Places 
 Poa, Bazèga, Burkina Faso
 Poa, Boulkiemdé, Burkina Faso
 Pacific Ocean Areas, World War II commands
 Po Lam station, Hong Kong, China, station code 
 Salgado Filho International Airport, Porto Alegre, Brazil, IATA code

Other 
 Price on application, abbreviation
 Plan of Action, abbreviation